Sir William Thomas Smartt  (Ireland, 22 February 1858 - Cape Town, 17 April 1929) was a South African politician, and founder and leader of the Unionist Party.

He graduated in medicine at the University of Dublin in 1880 and left for South Africa where he went to Britstown as physician. A keen farmer, he later founded the Smartt Syndicate, one of the largest dams in the then Cape Colony at Houwater near Britstown. He kept good relationships with local farmers and was an enthusiastic member of the Afrikaner Bond.

Smartt was chairman of the commission called Scab in 1892 and his report led to the Organisation nominating him as their candidate for the constituency in Wodehouse in the 1894 general election. He took his place in the Cape Legislative Assembly. In 1897, when  Rhodes's government fell, Smartt was interior minister in Sir Gordon Sprigg's cabinet. In 1898 the Sprigg government also collapsed and Smartt was a member of the Legislative Assembly to be elected in Cathcart. With the outbreak of the Anglo-Boer War in 1899 he was with Rhodes in Kimberley when it was besieged. He went on to become a commissioner in 1900 (Minister) for public works, but withdrew his support of Sprigg when the latter was opposed to the abolition of the Constitution. Smartt increased pressure for his claims to the premiership of Cape Colony in 1904 on Leander Starr Jameson, but was minister of lands and public works in Jameson's cabinet from 1904 to 1908.

As acting prime minister in 1905 he supported the expansion of the colony for  white settlements in Kakamas and set up a select committee for the allocation of vacant Crown land to eligible applicants. From 1908 to 1909 Smartt member of the National Convention, paving the way for the Union in 1910. In 1911 he founded the British Unionist wing, the Official Opposition in Parliament to the South African Party. He followed Jameson as party leader in 1912. Meanwhile, as  his first election after unification, he was elected as Member of Parliament for Fort Beaufort. He was removed in 1915 and again in 192. In 1920, he signed a coalition agreement with Gen.Jan Smuts and was minister of agriculture. When Gen. Jan Smuts was defeated in 1924, Smartt became as second in command of the Official Opposition.

He retired  from politics before the 1929 election and died on 17 April that same year.

References

South African knights
Unionist Party (South Africa) politicians
Members of the House of Assembly (South Africa)
1858 births
1929 deaths
South African people of Irish descent
Knights Commander of the Order of St Michael and St George
Members of the Privy Council of the United Kingdom
Politicians awarded knighthoods